David or Dave Ingram may refer to:

David Ingram (explorer), 16th-century English sailor
David Ingram (linguist) (born 1944), American linguist 
David Ingram (musician) (1948–2005), American musician
David S. Ingram (born 1941), British botanist
Dave Ingram (born 1969), British death metal vocalist
David Bronson Ingram, American businessman and philanthropist
David Bruce Ingram (born 1952), American philosopher